The Emirate of Nejd or Imamate of Nejd was the Second Saudi State, existing between 1824 and 1891 in Nejd, the regions of Riyadh and Ha'il of what is now Saudi Arabia. Saudi rule was restored to central and eastern Arabia after the Emirate of Diriyah, the First Saudi State, having previously been brought down by the Ottoman Empire's Egypt Eyalet in the Ottoman–Wahhabi War (1811–1818).

The second Saudi period was marked by less territorial expansion and less religious zeal, although the Saudi leaders continued to be called Imam and still employed Wahhabist religious scholars. Turki bin Abdullah bin Muhammad's reconquest of Riyadh from Egyptian forces in 1824 is generally regarded as the beginning of the Second Saudi State. Severe internal conflicts within the House of Saud eventually led to the dynasty's downfall at the Battle of Mulayda in 1891, between the forces loyal to the last Saudi imam, Abdul Rahman ibn Faisal ibn Turki, and the Rashidi dynasty of Ha'il.

History
The first Saudi to attempt to regain power after the fall of the Emirate of Diriyah in 1818 was Mishari bin Saud, a brother of the last ruler in Diriyah, Abdullah ibn Saud but he was soon captured by the Egyptians and killed. In 1824, Turki ibn Abdullah ibn Muhammad, a grandson of the first Saudi imam Muhammad ibn Saud who had managed to evade capture by the Egyptians, was able to expel Egyptian forces and their local allies from Riyadh and its environs and is generally regarded as the founder of the second Saudi dynasty as well as being the ancestor of the kings of modern-day Saudi Arabia. He made his capital in Riyadh and was able to enlist the services of many relatives who had escaped captivity in Egypt, including his son Faisal ibn Turki Al Saud.

Turki was assassinated in 1834 by Mishari bin Abdul Rahman, a distant cousin. Mishari was soon besieged in Riyadh and later executed by Faisal, who went on to become the most prominent ruler of the Saudis' second reign. Faisal, however, faced a re-invasion of Najd organised by Mehmet Ali. The local population was unwilling to resist, and Faisal was defeated and taken to Egypt as a prisoner for the second time in 1838.

The Egyptians installed Khalid bin Saud, last surviving brother of Abdullah bin Saud bin Abdulaziz, a great grandson of Muhammad bin Saud, had spent many years in the Egyptian court, as ruler in Riyadh and supported him with Egyptian troops. In 1840, however, external conflicts forced the Egyptians to withdraw all their presence in the Arabian Peninsula, leaving Khalid with little support. Seen by most locals as nothing more than an Egyptian governor, Khalid was toppled soon afterwards by Abdullah bin Thunayan, of the collateral Al Thunayan branch. Faisal, however, had been released that year and, aided by the Al Rashid rulers of Ha'il, was able to retake Riyadh and resume his rule, later appointing his son Abdullah bin Faisal bin Turki as heir apparent, and divided his dominions between his three sons Abdullah, Saud, and Muhammad. This time Faisal recognised Ottoman suzerainty and paid an annual tribute, in exchange he was recognised as “ruler of all the Arabs” by the Ottomans.

Upon Faisal's death in 1865 the state began to decline due to the fact that different rulers, namely Abdullah, Saud, Abdul Rahman and Saud's sons, became the head of the state until 1891. Immediately following the death of Faisal Abdullah assumed rule in Riyadh but was soon challenged by his brother, Saud. The two brothers fought a long civil war, in which they traded rule in Riyadh several times. A vassal of the Saudis, Muhammad bin Abdullah Al Rashid of Ha'il took the opportunity to intervene in the conflict and increase his own power. Gradually, Al Rashid extended his authority over most of Najd, including the Saudi capital, Riyadh. He finally expelled the last Saudi leader, Abdul Rahman bin Faisal, from Najd after the Battle of Mulayda in 1891.

Rulers
Abdul Rahman bin Faisal, last ruler of the Emirate.
 Imam Turki bin Abdullah bin Muhammad (first time) 1819–1820
 Imam Turki bin Abdullah bin Muhammad (second time) 1824–1834
 Imam Mishari bin Abdul Rahman bin Mishari 1834–1834 (Usurper)
 Imam Faisal bin Turki bin Abdullah Al Saud (first time) 1834–1838
 Imam Khalid bin Saud bin Abdulaziz Al Saud 1838–1841
 Imam Abdullah bin Thunayan bin Ibrahim bin Thunayan bin Saud 1841–1843
 Imam Faisal bin Turki bin Abdullah Al Saud (second time) 1843–1865
 Imam Abdullah bin Faisal bin Turki (first time) 1865–1871
 Imam Saud ibn Faisal 1871–1871 (first time)
 Imam Abdullah bin Faisal bin Turki (second time) 1871–1873
 Imam Saud bin Faisal (second time) 1873–1875
 Imam Abdul Rahman bin Faisal (first time) 1875–1876
 Imam Abdullah bin Faisal bin Turki (third time) 1876–1889
 Imam Abdul Rahman bin Faisal (second time) 1889–1891

See also
 Unification of Saudi Arabia
 List of Sunni Muslim dynasties

References

External links
 Second State of Saudi Arabia
 "The first and second Saudi states" Saudi Aramco World, January/February 1999, pp 4–11

19th century in Saudi Arabia
1824 establishments in Asia
1891 disestablishments in Asia
Former Arab states
Former countries in the Middle East
Emirate of Nejd
History of the United Arab Emirates
House of Saud
Ottoman Arabia
States and territories established in 1824
States and territories disestablished in 1891
Former emirates